A graphics card (also called a video card, display card, graphics adapter, VGA card/VGA, video adapter, display adapter, or colloquially GPU) is a computer expansion card that generates a feed of graphics output to a display device such as a monitor. Graphics cards are sometimes called discrete or dedicated graphics cards to emphasize their distinction to integrated graphics processor on the motherboard or the CPU. A graphics processing unit (GPU) that performs the necessary computations is the main component in a graphics card, but the acronym "GPU" is sometimes also used to refer to the graphics card as a whole.

Most graphics cards are not limited to simple display output. The graphics processing unit can be used for additional processing, which reduces the load from the central processing unit. Additionally, computing platforms such as OpenCL and CUDA allow using graphics cards for general-purpose computing. Applications of general-purpose computing on graphics cards include AI training, cryptocurrency mining, and molecular simulation.

Usually, a graphics card comes in the form of a printed circuit board (expansion board) which are to be inserted into an expansion slot. Others may have dedicated enclosures, and they are connected to the computer via a docking station or a cable. These are known as external GPUs (eGPUs).

Graphics cards are often preferred over integrated graphics for increased performance.

History 

Graphics cards historically supported different computer display standards as they evolved. For the IBM PC compatibles, common early standards were MDA, CGA, Hercules, EGA and VGA. 

In the late 1980s the like of Radius produced graphics cards for the Apple Macintosh II with discrete 2D QuickDraw capabilities.

3dfx Interactive was one of the first companies to develop a consumer-facing GPU with 3D acceleration (with the Voodoo series) and the first to develop a graphical chipset dedicated to 3D, but without 2D support (which therefore required the presence of a 2D card to work).

NVIDIA RIVA 128 was one of the first consumer-facing GPU integrated 3D processing unit and 2D processing unit on a chip.

Nowadays, the majority of modern graphics cards are built with either AMD-sourced or Nvidia-sourced graphics chips. Most graphics cards offer various functions such as 3D rendering, 2D graphics, MPEG-2/MPEG-4 decoding, TV output, and the ability to connect multiple monitors (multi-monitor). Graphics cards also have sound card capabilities to output sound along with video output for connected TVs or monitors with integrated speakers.

Within the industry, graphics cards are sometimes called graphics add-in-boards, abbreviated as AIBs, with the word "graphics" usually omitted.

Discrete vs integrated graphics 

As an alternative to the use of a graphics card, video hardware can be integrated into the motherboard, CPU, or a system-on-chip as integrated graphics. Motherboard-based implementations are sometimes called "on-board video". Some motherboards support using both integrated graphics and the graphics card simultaneously to feed separate displays. The main advantages of integrated graphics are: a low cost, compactness, simplicity, and low energy consumption. Integrated graphics often has less performance than a graphics card because the graphics processing unit inside integrated graphics needs to share system resources with the CPU. On the other hand, a graphics card has a separate random access memory (RAM), cooling system, and dedicated power regulators. A graphics card can offload work and reduce memory-bus-contention from the CPU and system RAM, therefore the overall performance for a computer could improve in addition to increased performance in graphics processing. Such improvements to performance can be seen in video gaming, 3D animation, and video editing.

Both AMD and Intel have introduced CPUs and motherboard chipsets which support the integration of a GPU into the same die as the CPU. AMD advertises CPUs with integrated graphics under the trademark Accelerated Processing Unit (APU), while Intel brands similar technology under "Intel Graphics Technology".

Power demand 
As the processing power of graphics cards increased, so did their demand for electrical power. Current high-performance graphics cards tend to consume large amounts of power. For example, the thermal design power (TDP) for the GeForce Titan RTX is 280 watts. When tested with video games, the GeForce RTX 2080 Ti Founder's Edition averaged 300 watts of power consumption. While CPU and power supply manufacturers have recently aimed toward higher efficiency, power demands of graphics cards continued to rise, with the largest power consumption of any individual part in a computer. Although power supplies have also increased their power output, the bottleneck occurs in the PCI-Express connection, which is limited to supplying 75 watts.

Modern graphics cards with a power consumption of over 75 watts usually include a combination of six-pin (75 W) or eight-pin (150 W) sockets that connect directly to the power supply. Providing adequate cooling becomes a challenge in such computers. Computers with multiple graphics cards may require power supplies over 750 watts. Heat extraction becomes a major design consideration for computers with two or more high-end graphics cards.

As of the Nvidia GeForce RTX 30 series, Ampere architecture, a custom flashed RTX 3090 named "Hall of Fame" has been recorded to reach a peak power draw as high as 630 watts. A standard RTX 3090 can peak at up to 450 watts. The RTX 3080 can reach up to 350 watts, while a 3070 can reach a similar, if not slightly lower peak power draw. Ampere cards are the first cards to feature a pass through cooler design to dissipate as much heat as possible, especially with large power consumptions.

Size 
Graphics cards for desktop computers have different size profiles, which allows graphics cards to be added to smaller-sized computers. Some graphics cards are not of the usual size, and are named as "low profile". Graphics card profiles are based on height only, with low-profile cards taking up less than the height of a PCIe slot, some can be as low as "half-height". Length and thickness can vary greatly, with high-end cards usually occupying two or three expansion slots, and with dual-GPU cards such as the Nvidia GeForce GTX 690  generally exceeding  in length. A lower profile card is preferred when trying to fit multiple cards or if graphics cards run into clearance issues with other motherboard components like the DIMM or PCIE slots. This can be fixed with a larger computer case such as mid-tower or full tower. Full towers are usually able to fit larger motherboards in sizes like ATX and micro ATX.

Multicard scaling 
Some graphics cards can be linked together to allow scaling graphics processing across multiple cards. This is done using either the PCIe bus on the motherboard or, more commonly, a data bridge. Usually, the cards must be of the same model to be linked, and most low end cards are not able to be linked in this way. AMD and Nvidia both have proprietary scaling methods, CrossFireX for AMD, and SLI (since the Turing generation, superseded by NVLink) for Nvidia. Cards from different chip-set manufacturers or architectures cannot be used together for multi-card scaling. If graphics cards have different sizes of memory, the lowest value will be used, with the higher values disregarded. Currently, scaling on consumer-grade cards can be done using up to four cards. The use of four cards requires a large motherboard with a proper configuration. Nvidia's GeForce GTX 590 graphics card can be configured in a four-card configuration. As stated above, users will want to stick to cards with the same performances for optimal use. Motherboards including ASUS Maximus 3 Extreme and Gigabyte GA EX58 Extreme are certified to work with this configuration. A large power supply is necessary to run the cards in SLI or CrossFireX. Power demands must be known before a proper supply is installed. For the four card configuration, a 1000+ watt supply is needed. With any relatively powerful graphics card, thermal management cannot be ignored. Graphics cards require well-vented chassis and good thermal solutions. Air or water cooling are usually required, though low end GPUs can use passive cooling. Larger configurations use water solutions or immersion cooling to achieve proper performance without thermal throttling.

SLI and Crossfire have become increasingly uncommon as most games do not fully utilize multiple GPUs, due to the fact that most users cannot afford them. Multiple GPUs are still used on supercomputers (like in Summit), on workstations to accelerate video and 3D rendering, visual effects, for simulations, and in training artificial intelligence.

3D graphics APIs 
A graphics driver usually supports one or multiple cards by the same vendor and has to be written for a specific operating system. Additionally, the operating system or an extra software package may provide certain programming APIs for applications to perform 3D rendering.

Specific usage 
Some GPUs are designed with specific usage in mind:

 Gaming
 GeForce GTX
 GeForce RTX
 Nvidia Titan
 Radeon HD
 Radeon RX
 Cloud gaming
 Nvidia Grid
 Radeon Sky
 Workstation
 Nvidia Quadro
 AMD FirePro
 Radeon Pro
 Cloud Workstation 
 Nvidia Tesla
 AMD FireStream
 Artificial Intelligence Cloud
 Nvidia Tesla
 Radeon Instinct
 Automated/Driverless car
 Nvidia Drive PX

Industry 
As of 2016, the primary suppliers of the GPUs (graphics chips or chipsets) used in graphics cards are AMD and Nvidia. In the third quarter of 2013, AMD had a 35.5% market share while Nvidia had 64.5%, according to Jon Peddie Research. In economics, this industry structure is termed a duopoly. AMD and Nvidia also build and sell graphics cards, which are termed graphics add-in-boards (AIBs) in the industry. (See Comparison of Nvidia graphics processing units and Comparison of AMD graphics processing units.) In addition to marketing their own graphics cards, AMD and Nvidia sell their GPUs to authorized AIB suppliers, which AMD and Nvidia refer to as "partners". The fact that Nvidia and AMD compete directly with their customer/partners complicates relationships in the industry. AMD and Intel being direct competitors in the CPU industry is also noteworthy, since AMD-based graphics cards may be used in computers with Intel CPUs. Intel's integrated graphics may weaken AMD, in which the latter derives a significant portion of its revenue from its APUs. As of the second quarter of 2013, there were 52 AIB suppliers. These AIB suppliers may market graphics cards under their own brands, produce graphics cards for private label brands, or produce graphics cards for computer manufacturers. Some AIB suppliers such as MSI build both AMD-based and Nvidia-based graphics cards. Others, such as EVGA, build only Nvidia-based graphics cards, while XFX, now builds only AMD-based graphics cards. Several AIB suppliers are also motherboard suppliers. Most of the largest AIB suppliers are based in Taiwan and they include ASUS, MSI, GIGABYTE, and Palit. Hong Kongbased AIB manufacturers include Sapphire and Zotac. Sapphire and Zotac also sell graphics cards exclusively for AMD and Nvidia GPUs respectively. The United States is also home to EVGA, and XFX which sell graphics cards exclusively for Nvidia and AMD respectively.

Market 
Graphics card shipments peaked at a total of 114 million in 1999. By contrast, they totaled 14.5 million units in the third quarter of 2013, a 17% fall from Q3 2012 levels. Shipments reached an annual total of 44 million in 2015. The sales of graphics cards have trended downward due to improvements in integrated graphics technologies; high-end, CPU-integrated graphics can provide competitive performance with low-end graphics cards. At the same time, graphics card sales have grown within the high-end segment, as manufacturers have shifted their focus to prioritize the gaming and enthusiast market.

Beyond the gaming and multimedia segments, graphics cards have been increasingly used for general-purpose computing, such as big data processing. The growth of cryptocurrency has placed a severely high demand on high-end graphics cards, especially in large quantities, due to their advantages in the process of cryptocurrency mining. In January 2018, mid- to high-end graphics cards experienced a major surge in price, with many retailers having stock shortages due to the significant demand among this market. Graphics card companies released mining-specific cards designed to run 24 hours a day, seven days a week, and without video output ports. The graphics card industry took a setback due to the 202021 chip shortage.

Parts 

A modern graphics card consists of a printed circuit board on which the components are mounted. These include:

Graphics processing unit 

A graphics processing unit (GPU), also occasionally called visual processing unit (VPU), is a specialized electronic circuit designed to rapidly manipulate and alter memory to accelerate the building of images in a frame buffer intended for output to a display. Because of the large degree of programmable computational complexity for such a task, a modern graphics card is also a computer unto itself.

Heat sink 
A heat sink is mounted on most modern graphics cards. A heat sink spreads out the heat produced by the graphics processing unit evenly throughout the heat sink and unit itself. The heat sink commonly has a fan mounted to cool the heat sink and the graphics processing unit. Not all cards have heat sinks, for example, some cards are liquid-cooled and instead have a water block; additionally, cards from the 1980s and early 1990s did not produce much heat, and did not require heat sinks. Most modern graphics cards need proper thermal solutions. They can be water-cooled or through heat sinks with additional connected heat pipes usually made of copper for the best thermal transfer.

Video BIOS 
The video BIOS or firmware contains a minimal program for the initial set up and control of the graphics card. It may contain information on the memory and memory timing, operating speeds and voltages of the graphics processor, and other details which can sometimes be changed.

Modern Video BIOSes do not support full functionalities of graphics cards; they are only sufficient to identify and initialize the card to display one of a few frame buffer or text display modes. It does not support YUV to RGB translation, video scaling, pixel copying, compositing or any of the multitude of other 2D and 3D features of the graphics card, which must be accessed by software drivers.

Video memory 

The memory capacity of most modern graphics cards ranges from 2 to 24 GB. But with up to 32 GB as of the last 2010s, the applications for graphics use are becoming more powerful and widespread. Since video memory needs to be accessed by the GPU and the display circuitry, it often uses special high-speed or multi-port memory, such as VRAM, WRAM, SGRAM, etc. Around 2003, the video memory was typically based on DDR technology. During and after that year, manufacturers moved towards DDR2, GDDR3, GDDR4, GDDR5, GDDR5X, and GDDR6. The effective memory clock rate in modern cards is generally between 2 to 15 GHz.

Video memory may be used for storing other data as well as the screen image, such as the Z-buffer, which manages the depth coordinates in 3D graphics, textures, vertex buffers, and compiled shader programs.

RAMDAC 
The RAMDAC, or random-access-memory digital-to-analog converter, converts digital signals to analog signals for use by a computer display that uses analog inputs such as cathode-ray tube (CRT) displays. The RAMDAC is a kind of RAM chip that regulates the functioning of the graphics card. Depending on the number of bits used and the RAMDAC-data-transfer rate, the converter will be able to support different computer-display refresh rates. With CRT displays, it is best to work over 75 Hz and never under 60 Hz, to minimize flicker. (With LCD displays, flicker is not a problem) Due to the growing popularity of digital computer displays and the integration of the RAMDAC onto the GPU die, it has mostly disappeared as a discrete component. All current LCD/plasma monitors and TVs and projectors with only digital connections, work in the digital domain and do not require a RAMDAC for those connections. There are displays that feature analog inputs (VGA, component, SCART, etc.) only. These require a RAMDAC, but they reconvert the analog signal back to digital before they can display it, with the unavoidable loss of quality stemming from this digital-to-analog-to-digital conversion. With VGA standard being phased out in favor of digital, RAMDACs are beginning to disappear from graphics cards.

Output interfaces 

The most common connection systems between the graphics card and the computer display are:

Video Graphics Array (VGA) (DE-15) 

Also known as D-sub, VGA is an analog-based standard adopted in the late 1980s designed for CRT displays, also called VGA connector. Some problems of this standard are electrical noise, image distortion and sampling error in evaluating pixels.
Today, the VGA analog interface is used for high definition video including 1080p and higher. While the VGA transmission bandwidth is high enough to support even higher resolution playback, the picture quality can degrade depending on cable quality and length. The extent of quality difference depends on the individual's eyesight and the display; when using a DVI or HDMI connection, especially on larger sized LCD/LED monitors or TVs, quality degradation, if present, is prominently visible. Blu-ray playback at 1080p is possible via the VGA analog interface, if Image Constraint Token (ICT) is not enabled on the Blu-ray disc.

Digital Visual Interface (DVI) 

Digital Visual Interface is a digital-based standard designed for displays such as flat-panel displays (LCDs, plasma screens, wide high-definition television displays) and video projectors. In some rare cases, high-end CRT monitors also use DVI. It avoids image distortion and electrical noise, corresponding each pixel from the computer to a display pixel, using its native resolution. It is worth noting that most manufacturers include a DVI-I connector, allowing (via simple adapter) standard RGB signal output to an old CRT or LCD monitor with VGA input.

Video-in video-out (VIVO) for S-Video, composite video and component video 

These connectors are included to allow connection with televisions, DVD players, video recorders and video game consoles. They often come in two 10-pin mini-DIN connector variations, and the VIVO splitter cable generally comes with either 4 connectors (S-Video in and out plus composite video in and out), or 6 connectors (S-Video in and out plus component PB out plus component PR out + component Y out [also composite out] plus composite in).

High-Definition Multimedia Interface (HDMI) 

HDMI is a compact audio/video interface for transferring uncompressed video data and compressed/uncompressed digital audio data from an HDMI-compliant device ("the source device") to a compatible digital audio device, computer monitor, video projector, or digital television. HDMI is a digital replacement for existing analog video standards. HDMI supports copy protection through HDCP.

DisplayPort 

DisplayPort is a digital display interface developed by the Video Electronics Standards Association (VESA). The interface is primarily used to connect a video source to a display device such as a computer monitor, though it can also be used to transmit audio, USB, and other forms of data.
The VESA specification is royalty-free. VESA designed it to replace VGA, DVI, and LVDS. Backward compatibility to VGA and DVI by using adapter dongles enables consumers to use DisplayPort fitted video sources without replacing existing display devices. Although DisplayPort has a greater throughput of the same functionality as HDMI, it is expected to complement the interface, not replace it.

USB-C

Other types of connection systems

Motherboard interfaces 

Chronologically, connection systems between graphics card and motherboard were, mainly:

 S-100 bus: Designed in 1974 as a part of the Altair 8800, it is the first industry-standard bus for the microcomputer industry.
 ISA: Introduced in 1981 by IBM, it became dominant in the marketplace in the 1980s. It is an 8- or 16-bit bus clocked at 8 MHz.
 NuBus: Used in Macintosh II, it is a 32-bit bus with an average bandwidth of 10 to 20 MB/s.
 MCA: Introduced in 1987 by IBM it is a 32-bit bus clocked at 10 MHz.
 EISA: Released in 1988 to compete with IBM's MCA, it was compatible with the earlier ISA bus. It is a 32-bit bus clocked at 8.33 MHz.
 VLB: An extension of ISA, it is a 32-bit bus clocked at 33 MHz. Also referred to as VESA.
 PCI: Replaced the EISA, ISA, MCA and VESA buses from 1993 onwards. PCI allowed dynamic connectivity between devices, avoiding the manual adjustments required with jumpers. It is a 32-bit bus clocked 33 MHz.
 UPA: An interconnect bus architecture introduced by Sun Microsystems in 1995. It is a 64-bit bus clocked at 67 or 83 MHz.
 USB: Although mostly used for miscellaneous devices, such as secondary storage devices or peripherals and toys, USB displays and display adapters exist. It was first used in 1996.
 AGP: First used in 1997, it is a dedicated-to-graphics bus. It is a 32-bit bus clocked at 66 MHz.
 PCI-X: An extension of the PCI bus, it was introduced in 1998. It improves upon PCI by extending the width of bus to 64 bits and the clock frequency to up to 133 MHz.
 PCI Express: Abbreviated as PCIe, it is a point-to-point interface released in 2004. In 2006, it provided a data-transfer rate that is double of AGP. It should not be confused with PCI-X, an enhanced version of the original PCI specification. This is standard for most graphics cards.

The following table is a comparison between features of some interfaces listed above.

See also 
 List of computer hardware
 List of graphics card manufacturers
 Computer display standards – a detailed list of standards like SVGA, WXGA, WUXGA, etc.
 AMD (ATI), Nvidia – quasi duopoly of 3D chip GPU and graphics card designers
 GeForce, Radeon – examples of popular graphics card series
 GPGPU (i.e.: CUDA, AMD FireStream)
 Framebuffer – the computer memory used to store a screen image
 Capture card – the inverse of a graphics card

References

Sources 
 Mueller, Scott (2005) Upgrading and Repairing PCs. 16th edition. Que Publishing.

External links 

 

Graphics hardware